Keytronic (formerly Key Tronic) is a technology company founded in 1969. Its core products initially included keyboards, mice and other input devices. KeyTronic currently specializes in PCBA and full product assembly. The company is among the ten largest contract manufacturers providing electronic manufacturing services in the US. The company offers full product design or assembly of a wide variety of household goods and electronic products such as keyboards, printed circuit board assembly, plastic molding, thermometers, toilet bowl cleaners, satellite tracking systems, etc.

Keyboards
After the introduction of the IBM PC, Keytronic began manufacturing keyboards compatible with those computer system units.

Most of their keyboards are based on the 8048 microcontroller to communicate to the computer.  Their early keyboards used an Intel 8048 MCU.  However, as the company evolved, they began to use their own 8048-based and 83C51KB-based MCUs.

In 1978, Keytronic Corporation introduced keyboards with capacitive-based switches, one of the first keyboard technologies to not use self-contained switches. There was simply a sponge pad with a conductive-coated Mylar plastic sheet on the switch plunger, and two half-moon trace patterns on the printed circuit board below. As the key was depressed, the capacitance between the plunger pad and the patterns on the PCB below changed, which was detected by integrated circuits (IC). These keyboards were claimed to have the same reliability as the other "solid-state switch" keyboards such as inductive and Hall-Effect, but competitive with direct-contact keyboards.

ErgoForce 
Among modern keyboard enthusiasts, Keytronic is known mostly for its "ErgoForce" technology, where different keys have rubber domes with different stiffness. The alphabetic keys intended to be struck with the little finger need only 35 grams of force to actuate, while other alphabetic keys need 45 grams. Other keys can be as stiff as 80 grams.

Corporate information
The company, which has been described as a contract manufacturer, was founded in 1969, went public in 1983, and has an estimated 5,000 employees.

During 2016-2017, statements and press releases about Cemtrex's proposed acquisition of Keytronic have been released.

References

External links 

Circuitsassembly.com: "Key Tronic named the CIRCUITS ASSEMBLY EMS Company of the Year in 2009"

Computer peripheral companies
Computer companies of the United States
Companies based in Spokane, Washington
Computer companies established in 1969
Electronics companies established in 1969
Companies listed on the Nasdaq
Computer keyboard companies